Cyril Meir Scott (27 September 1879 – 31 December 1970) was an English composer, writer, poet, and occultist.  He created around four hundred musical compositions including piano, violin, cello concertos, symphonies, and  operas. He also wrote around 20 pamphlets and books on occult topics and natural health.

Biography
Scott was born in Oxton, Cheshire to Henry Scott (1843-1918), shipper and scholar of Greek and Hebrew, and Mary (née Griffiths), an amateur pianist of Welsh origin. He showed a talent for music from an early age and was sent to the Hoch Conservatory in Frankfurt, Germany to study piano in 1892 at age 12.  He studied with Iwan Knorr and belonged to the Frankfurt Group, a circle of composers who studied at the Hoch Conservatory in the late 1890s. At 20, the German poet Stefan George helped Scott organize a performance of Scott's first symphony. He played his Piano Quartet with Fritz Kreisler, Emil Kreuz, and Ludwig Lebell in St. James' Hall in 1903.

In 1902 he met the pianist Evelyn Suart, with whom he had a long artistic association. She championed his music, premiering many of his works, and introducing him to his publisher, Elkin, with whom he remained for the rest of his life. Evelyn Suart was also a Christian Scientist, and it was through her that Scott became interested in metaphysics. Scott dedicated his Scherzo, Op. 25 to Evelyn Suart.

Music
His experiments in free rhythm, generated by expanding musical motifs, above all in his First Piano Sonata of 1909, appear to have exerted an influence on Stravinsky's The Rite of Spring (see The Cyril Scott Companion, pp. 45–47). He used to be known as 'the English Debussy', though this reflected little knowledge of Scott and little understanding of Debussy.

Alternative medicine

Scott had an interest in alternative medicine, health foods, occultism, naturopathy, philosophy and yoga. In a series of books and pamphlets, he urged the sick, even those with cancer, to trust diet and alternative medicine and avoid trained medics and surgery. Scott was an alternative cancer treatment advocate and authored two works on this subject. He also recommended people to consume black molasses and cider vinegar.

Compositions (selective list)

Dramatic

Opera
 The Alchemist (1917–18)
 The Saint of the Mountain (1924–25)
 The Shrine (c. 1925–26)
 Maureen O'Mara (1945)

Ballet
 The Incompetent Apothecary (1923)
 Karma (1924)
 Masque of the Red Death (1930)

Incidental music
 Othello (1920)
 Return to Nature (1920)
 Smetse Smee (c. 1925–26)
 Susannah and the Elders (1937)

Orchestral
 Symphony No. 1 in G major (1899)
 Pelleas and Melisanda, overture, Op. 5 (1900) [later revised as Op. 20]
 Lyric Suite, Op. 6 (1900)
 Heroic Suite, Op. 7 (c. 1900)
 Christmas Overture (c. 1900)
 Symphony No. 2 in A minor (1901–02) [withdrawn and revised as Three Symphonic Dances]
 Princess Maleine, overture, Op. 18 (1902) [withdrawn and revised as Festival Overture]
 Aglavaine et Sélysette, overture, Op. 21 (c. 1902)
 Rhapsody for orchestra No. 1, Op. 32 (1904)
 Aubade, Op. 77 (1905, revised c. 1911)
 Three Symphonic Dances, Op. 22 (c. 1907) [revised from Symphony No. 2]
 Egypt, ballet suite (1913)
 Two Passacaglias on Irish Themes (1914)
 Britain's War March (1914)
 Suite Fantastique, for chamber orchestra (c. 1928)
 Neptune, poem of the sea (1933, revised 1935) [originally titled Disaster at Sea]
 Symphony No. 3, The Muses, with chorus (1937)
 Ode descantique, for string orchestra (c. 1940)
 Hourglass Suite, for chamber orchestra (c. 1949)
 Symphony No. 4 (1951–52)
 Neapolitan Rhapsody (1959)
 Sinfonietta for organ, harp and strings (1962)

Concertante works
 Piano Concerto in D major, Op. 10 (1900)
 Cello Concerto, Op. 19 (1902)
 Piano Concerto No. 1 (1913–14)
 Violin Concerto (c. 1925)
 Philomel, for cello and orchestra (c. 1925)
 Double concerto for violin, cello and orchestra (1926)
 The Melodist and the Nightingale, for cello and orchestra (1929)
 Early One Morning for piano and orchestra (1930–31, revised 1962)
 Concertino for two pianos and orchestra (1931)
 Double concerto for two violins and orchestra (1931)
 Passacaglia Festevole, for two pianos and orchestra (c. 1935)
 Cello Concerto (1937)
 Concerto for harpsichord and orchestra (1937)
 Concerto for oboe and strings (1946)
 Concertino for bassoon, flute and strings (1951)
 Piano Concerto No. 2 (1958)

Choral music
 Magnificat, for soloists, chorus orchestra and organ (1899)
 The Ballad of Fair Helen of Kirkonnel, for baritone, chorus and orchestra, Op. 8 (1900)
 My Captain, for voice and piano, Op. 38 (1904)
 Nativity Hymn, for soloists, chorus and orchestra (1913–14)
 La belle dame sans merci, for baritone, chorus and orchestra (1915–17)
 Festival Overture, for chorus and orchestra (1929)
 Mystic Ode, for chorus and chamber orchestra (1932)
 Summerland, for chorus and orchestra (1935)
 Ode to Great Men, for tenor, female chorus and orchestra (1936)
 Hymn to Unity, for soloists, chorus and orchestra (1947)

Chamber music
 Piano Trio in E minor, Op. 3 (c. 1899)
 Piano Quartet in E minor, Op. 16 (1899)
 String Quartet, Op. 12 (c. 1900)
 Sextet for piano and strings, Op. 26 (c. 1903, rev. 1914 as Quintet, performed and later withdrawn)
 String Quartet, Op. 28 (c. 1903)
 String Quartet in F major, Op. 31 (c. 1904)
 Violin Sonata No. 1 in C major, Op. 59 (1908)
 String Quartet No. 1 (1919)
 String Quintet No. 1 (1919)
 Piano Trio No. 1 (c. 1920, publ. 1922)
 Piano Quintet No. 1 (1920, publ. 1924, previous Quintets had been performed, but later withdrawn)
 Quintet for flute, harp, violin, viola and cello (1926)
 String Trio No. 1 (1931)
 Sonata Lirica for violin and piano (1937)
 Viola Sonata (1939, revised 1953)
 String Trio No. 2 (1949)
 Piano Trio No. 2 (1950)
 Violin Sonata No. 2, Sonata Melodica (1950)
 Cello Sonata (1950)
 String Quartet No. 2 (1951)
 Quintet for clarinet and strings (1951)
 Piano Quintet No. 2 (1952)
 String Quintet No. 2 (1953)
 Violin Sonata No. 3 (1955)
 Trio for clarinet, cello and piano (c. 1955)
 Violin Sonata No. 4 (1956)
 Piano Trio No. 3 (1957)
 String Quartet No. 3 (1961)
 Flute Sonata (1961)
 Trio Pastorale for flute, cello and piano (1961)
 String Quartet No. 4 (1964)

Piano solo
 Piano Sonata in D major, Op.17 (1901)(W 329)
 Handelian Rhapsody, for piano (revision, ed. Percy Grainger), Op. 17 (1909) (W 134)
 Scherzo, Op.25 (1904)
 2 Pierrot Pieces, Op.35 (1904)
 2 Piano Pieces, Op.37 (1904)
 Solitude, Op.40–1 (1904)
 Vesperale, Op.40–2 (1904)
 Chimes, Op.40–3 (1904)
 Lotus Land, Op.47–1 (1905)
 Columbine, Op.47–2 (1905)
 Summerland, Op.54 (1907)
 2 Alpine Sketches, Op.58 (1908)
 Dance Nègre (1908)
 Sphinx, Op.63 (1908)
 Piano Sonata No.1, Op.66 (1909)
 4 Piano Pieces, Op.67 (1909–10)
 Piano Suite, Op.71–1 (1910)
 Water-Wagtail (1910)
 Berceuse in E-flat (1911)
 Pierrette (1912)
 3 British Melodies (1912)
 Rainbow Trout (1916)
 Piano Sonata No.2 (1935)
 Piano Sonata No.3 (1956)

Other instrumental solo

 The Ecstatic Shepherd, for solo flute (c. 1922)
 Celtic Fantasy, for solo harp (1926)
 Sonatina, for solo guitar (c. 1927) (commissioned by Andrés Segovia)
 Idyll, for solo violin (1928)

Literature

Prose
1917 The Philosophy of Modernism, in its Connection with Music
1920 The Initiate: Some Impressions of a Great Soul (Anon.)
1920 The Adept of Galilee – A Story and an Argument (Anon.)
1924 Autobiography: My Years of Indiscretion
1927 The Initiate in the New World (Anon.)
1928 The Art of Making a Perfect Husband
1930 Childishness: A Study in Occult Conduct
1932 The Initiate in the Dark Cycle (Anon.)
1933 Vision of the Nazarene (Anon.)
1933 Music: Its Secret Influence Throughout the Ages
1936 The Greater Awareness
1939 Man is my Theme
1939 The Ghost of a Smile
1942 The Christian Paradox
1952 Die Tragoedie Stefan George
1953 Man the Unruly Child
1953 Simpler and Safer Remedies for Grievous Ills
1953 The Boy Who Saw True
1969 Autobiography: Bone of Contention

Alternative medicine

1939 Victory Over Cancer: Without Radium Or Surgery
1940 Health, Diet and Commonsense
1938 Doctors, Disease and Health
1946 Crude Black Molasses
1946 Medicine, Rational and Irrational
1948 Cider Vinegar
1953 Simpler and Safer Remedies for Grievous Ills
1955 Sleeplessness: Its Prevention and Cure by Harmless Methods
1956 Constipation and Commonsense
1968 Cancer Prevention: Fallacies and Some Reassuring Facts

Occultism

1935 Outline of Modern Occultism
1957 Occultism: An Alternative to Scientific Humanism

Poetry
190? The Shadows of Silence and the Songs of Yesterday
1907 The Grave of Eros and the Book of Mournful Melodies
1909 Translation: The Flowers of Evil (Charles Baudelaire)
1910 Translation: Poems of Stefan George (Selections from his Works)
1910 The Voice of the Ancient
1912 The Vales of Unity
1915 The Celestial Aftermath: A Springtime of the Heart and Faraway Songs
1943 The Poems of playboy

Bibliography
 Hull, A. Eaglefield: Cyril Scott. Composer, Poet and Philosopher. London, 1918.
 Sampsel, Laurie J.: Cyril Scott: A Bio-Bibliography. Greenwood, 2000.
 Collins, Sarah. The Aesthetic Life of Cyril Scott. Boydell, 2013.
 Scott, Desmond, and others (edd.), The Cyril Scott Companion. Boydell, 2018.

See also 
 
 The Initiate, by Cyril Scott

References

External links

Cyril Scott (official website)
 
 
 

Sheet music by Scott

1879 births
1970 deaths
19th-century British composers
19th-century classical composers
19th-century classical pianists
19th-century English musicians
19th-century British male musicians
20th-century British male musicians
20th-century classical composers
20th-century classical pianists
20th-century English composers
Alternative cancer treatment advocates
Alternative medicine activists
British male pianists
Composers for piano
English classical composers
English classical pianists
English male classical composers
English occult writers
English opera composers
Male classical pianists
Male opera composers
Hoch Conservatory alumni
English occultists
People from Birkenhead
Pupils of Iwan Knorr